National Route 151 is a national highway of Japan connecting Iida, Nagano and Toyohashi, Aichi in Japan, with a total length of 137.4 km (85.38 mi).

References

151
Roads in Aichi Prefecture
Roads in Nagano Prefecture